Platynota viridana is a species of moth of the family Tortricidae first described by William Barnes and August Busck in . It is found in the United States in Arizona, Texas and South Carolina.

The wingspan is 13–18 mm.

References

Moths described in 1920
Platynota (moth)